Titles & Emoluments in Safavid Iran: A Third Manual of Safavid Administration is a book about the Safavid Empire, published by Mage Publishers, with Willem Floor as author. According to the book description it: "contains unique and important information on offices, ethnic attitudes and administrative developments in Iran's Safavid government". The book lists administrative jurisdictions with names and dates of each of its governors.

See also
 Mirza Naqi Nasiri

References

2008 non-fiction books
Safavid Iran
History books about Iran